Dionne Warwick: Don't Make Me Over is an American documentary film directed by Dave Wooley and David Heilbroner. It follows the life and career of Dionne Warwick.

On January 1, 2023, It premiered on CNN.

Synopsis
The film follows the life and career of Dionne Warwick. Quincy Jones, Burt Bacharach, Bill Clinton, Clive Davis, Gladys Knight, Cissy Houston, Elton John, Damon Elliott, Kenneth Cole, Berry Gordy, Jerry Blavat, Snoop Dogg and Smokey Robinson appear in the film.

Release
The film had its world premiere at the 2021 Toronto International Film Festival in September 2021. It screened at the Montclair Film Festival on October 23, 2021. In February 2022, CNN+ acquired distribution rights to the film. The streaming service, however, ended shortly after launch and Dionne announced on her Twitter account that the documentary will have an on-air cable broadcast premiere date of August 28, 2022, exclusively on CNN. The film premiered on January 1, 2023, debuting at #1 among cable news viewers aged 25-54.

Awards
At TIFF, the film was first runner-up for the People's Choice Award for Documentaries. The film also won the Best Feature honor at the Gene Siskel Film Center’s Black Harvest Film Festival, as well as receiving Centerpiece Screening at DOC NYC and landing the Audience Award at the 2021 Montclair Film Festival.

References

External links
 

2021 films
2021 documentary films
American documentary films
Documentary films about singers
Documentary films about women in music
2020s English-language films
Films directed by David Heilbroner
2020s American films